Miranda is an electoral district of the Legislative Assembly in the Australian state of New South Wales. It is represented by Eleni Petinos of the Liberal Party.

Miranda  is located in the north of Sutherland Shire on the south shore of Georges River. It includes the suburbs of Alfords Point, Bonnet Bay, Como, Gymea, Illawong, Jannali, Kangaroo Point, Kareela, Kirrawee, Miranda, Oyster Bay, Sylvania, Sylvania Waters, Taren Point and parts of Caringbah and Sutherland.

History

Created in 1971, Miranda had traditionally been a  electorate, being won by  only at landslide elections, two under Neville Wran in 1978 and 1981, and again under Bob Carr in 1999 and 2003. According to ABC psephologist Antony Green, the seat should have been recovered by the Liberals in 2007 but was narrowly retained by Labor. On a margin of 0.8 percent it was the Labor government's most marginal seat. In 2011 the Liberals won government in a landslide, and the seat of Miranda on a very safe 21.0 percent margin, with 39 seats held by the Coalition on smaller margins.

The seat was made vacant following the resignation of Liberal MP Graham Annesley. The 2013 Miranda by-election was conducted on 19 October, Labor's Barry Collier won the seat with a two-party swing of 26 percent in the largest by-election swing in the state's history. He did not stand for re-election at the 2015 NSW State election and the seat was subsequently won by the Liberal Party's Eleni Petinos.

Members for Miranda

Election results

References

Miranda
1971 establishments in Australia
Miranda